Yuri Vasilievich (Юрий Васильевич; 30 October 1532 – 24 June 1563) was the only brother of Ivan the Terrible. He was born deaf, and was thus never considered to be a candidate as heir to the Russian throne. He ruled the appanage principality of Uglich on the Volga.

Yuri was the second son of Vasily III of Russia and Elena Glinskaya. He was a year and a half old when his father died of a leg abscess, and six when his mother was apparently poisoned. According to letters written by his older brother Ivan, the two children customarily felt neglected and offended by the mighty boyars from the Shuisky and Belsky families. Unlike his brother who spent his spare time in learning theology, Yuri was apparently only interested in food and games including ice-skating. Yuri accompanied his brother during the latter's coronation as Tsar, and was later given a private residence with servants. On 16 June 1552, during the Russo-Kazan war, Yuri was given full charge of state affairs while his brother accompanied the army to Kazan. Yuri was married on 3 November 1547 to Princess Ulyana of Palekh (Paletskaya) and had a son, Vasili, in 1559. The child died 11 months later.

Yuri died three years later from natural causes. His wife was sent to the Novodevichy Convent. Yuri's property was inherited by his elder brother.

References
 Troyat, Henri Ivan le Terrible. Flammarion, Paris, 1982
 de Madariaga, Isabel Ivan the Terrible. Giulio Einaudi editore, 2005

1532 births
1563 deaths
Rurik dynasty
People from Uglich
Deaf royalty and nobility
16th-century Russian people
People of Byzantine descent
Russian deaf people